Lamprochromus is a genus of flies in the family Dolichopodidae.

Species
 Lamprochromus amabilis Parent, 1944
 Lamprochromus belousovi (Grichanov, 2008)
 Lamprochromus bifasciatus (Macquart, 1827)
 Lamprochromus buchtojarovi Negrobov & Tshalaja, 1988
 Lamprochromus canadensis (Van Duzee, 1917) (Synonym: Telmaturgus brevicornis Robinson, 1960)
 Lamprochromus dalmaticus Parent, 1927
 Lamprochromus defectivus Strobl, 1899
 Lamprochromus kowarzi Negrobov & Tshalaja, 1988
 Lamprochromus moraviensis Negrobov & Tshalaja, 1988
 Lamprochromus occidasiaticus Grichanov & Ahmadi, 2017
 Lamprochromus occidentalis Robinson, 1967
 Lamprochromus satrapa (Wheeler, 1890)
 Lamprochromus semiflavus (Strobl, 1880) (Synonym: L. strobli Parent, 1925)
 Lamprochromus speciosus (Loew, 1871)

References 

 Europe
 Nearctic

Dolichopodidae genera
Sympycninae
Diptera of Europe
Diptera of North America
Diptera of Africa
Taxa named by Josef Mik